Prionopelta media is a species of ant, discovered and described by Shattuck, S. O. in 2008. It can be found in Papua New Guinea.

References

Amblyoponinae
Insects described in 2008